The 1894 Harvard Crimson football team represented Harvard University as an independent during the 1894 college football season. The team finished with an 11–2 record under first-year head coach William A. Brooks.  The team won its first 11 games by a combined total of 326 to 16, but lost the final two games to Yale (4–12) and Penn (4–18).

Harvard tackle Bert Waters was a consensus first-team All-American.

Schedule

References

Harvard
Harvard Crimson football seasons
Harvard Crimson football
19th century in Boston